The 1987–88 World Series was a One Day International (ODI) cricket tri-series where Australia played host to New Zealand and Sri Lanka. Australia and New Zealand reached the Finals, which Australia won 2–0.

Points Table
Below is the final points tally:

Result summary

Final series
Australia won the best of three final series against New Zealand 2–0.

References

Australian Tri-Series
1987 in Australian cricket
1987 in Sri Lankan cricket
1987–88 Australian cricket season
1988 in Australian cricket
1988 in Sri Lankan cricket
International cricket competitions from 1985–86 to 1988
1987–88
1987–88